The Taiwan Academy of Banking and Finance (TABF) is a non-profit organization, advised by Financial Supervisory Commission (FSC) of Taiwan. It is a pioneer in Taiwan for research, training, proficiency testing, and publication services for banking professionals.

Currently, Dr. Jain-Rong Su is the chairman and Dr. Hank C.C. HUANG is the president in TABF.

History
In May of 2000 TABF was officially established through the merger of the Banking Institute of the Republic of China (BIROC) and the Banking and Finance Institute (BFI).

Organizational structures
 Financial Research Institute
 Training and Development Institute
 Overseas Business Institute
 Proficiency Testing Institute
 Publication and Communication Institute
 Customer Service Center
 Administration Department
 Information Technology Department

Services
 Financial Research: To provide policy suggestions to financial regulatory authorities, and illustrate a vision for both the government as well as financial services industries.
 Financial Training & Development: To provide banking practitioners with systematic learning paths to navigate challenges and opportunities in their professional life.
 Proficiency Testing: To issue banking accreditation certificates to enhance the quality of the financial workforce.
 Publication and Communication: To publish a variety of specialized financial books and issue the Taiwan Banker magazine. 
 Fin & Tech Innovation Village: To enrich FinTech talent and provide technological consulting services.

Overseas business development
TABF founded the Overseas Business Institute (OBI) in 2010 in order to help promote the internationalization of Taiwan’s financial services.First, the OBI offers a wide array of international training programmes and courses for financial professionals. Meanwhile, TABF acts as a regional hub for financial knowledge transfers between Taiwan and the rest of world, keen to extend its international financial networks to build meaningful connections and strengthen mutually beneficial partnerships. For instance, TABF has been honoured to take over as the secretariat office of the Asian Pacific Association of Banking Institutes (APABI), engaging with the total of 21 member countries in the Asia-Pacific to foster exchange and collaboration on financial training and education. Furthermore, TABF has formally joined the Talent Circulation Alliance (TCA) in Taiwan to develop international talent by promoting talent connection, cultivation, and circulation between Taiwan and other like-minded countries.

Board members

Directors
 Jain-Rong Su (the Chairman of Taiwan Academy of Banking and Finance)
 Hank C.C. Huang (the President of Taiwan Academy of Banking and Finance)
 Sherri H.Y. Chuang (the Director General of Banking Bureau of the Financial Supervisory Commission)
 Tsung-Yung Lee (the Director General of Bureau of Agricultural Finance, Council of Agriculture, Executive Yuan)
 Ti-Jen Tsao (the Deputy Director General of Department of Economic Research of the Central Bank of the Republic of China)
 LEI, CHUNG-DAR (the Chairman of The Bankers Association of the Republic of China)
 Ling, Jong-Yuan (the Chairman of Chang Hwa Commercial Bank)
 HUI- PING, CHEN (the Chief Compliance Officer of Bank Of Taiwan)
 Lin Chien-Hao (the Chairman of Taiwan Business Bank)
 James Chen (the President of Chinatrust Commercial Bank)
 Tina Lo (the Chairman of O-Bank)
 Mei-Chu Liao (the Chairman of R.O.C. Bills Finance Association)
 Monica Chiou (the Chairman of Trust Association of R.O.C.)
 Shen-Gang Mai (the Chairman of The National Federation of Credit Co-operatives R. O. C.)

Supervisors
 Chang,Tzy-Hao (the Director General of Financial Examination Bureau of the Financial Supervisory Commission)
 Ching-Ting Lin (the Associate Professor of Department of Money and Banking, National Chengchi University)
 Ti-Juan Wu (the Director General of Department of Economic Research of the Central Bank of the Republic of China)
 Chen,Jie (the Chairman of Supervision Committee of The National Federation of Credit Co-operatives R. O. C.)
 Kao Chung (the Executive Director of Tamsui District Farmers' Association)

References

2000 establishments in Taiwan
Educational organizations based in Taiwan
Financial services companies of Taiwan
Organizations established in 2000
Banking in Taiwan